The Spanish Synagogue is the newest synagogue in the area of the so-called Jewish Town, yet paradoxically, it was built at the place of the presumably oldest synagogue, Old School (also known as Altshul). The synagogue is built in Moorish Revival Style. Only a little park with a modern statue of famous Prague writer Franz Kafka (by Jaroslav Róna) lies between it and the church of Holy Spirit. Today, the Spanish Synagogue is administered by the Jewish Museum in Prague.

History 
The Spanish Synagogue is not the first synagogue at the site. Before it there stood probably the oldest synagogue in Prague Jewish Town, Altschule. In the second half of 19th century, the capacity of the Altschule did not suffice. The modernist faction in the community, which renovated it in 1837 for the purpose of moderately reformed services, therefore decided to demolish the synagogue in 1867 and one year later it was replaced by the new, Spanish Synagogue. Its name presumably refers to the style in which it was built, Moorish Revival style, which was inspired by the art of Arabic period of Spanish history (this name was not always prevalent, in the beginnings it was usually called by German-speaking Jews Geistgasse-Tempel, i.e. Temple in Holy Spirit Street). The architectural plans were designed by Vojtěch Ignác Ullmann and Josef Niklas (an imposing interior decoration).

In 1935, a functionalistic building, designed by Karel Pecánek, was added to the synagogue. Until Second World War it served the Jewish Community as a hospital. The synagogue used the space of the new building as well; there was a vestibule and a winter oratory in it. Since 1935, the appearance of the synagogue has remained essentially unchanged.

During the Second World War, confiscated properties of Czech Jewish Communities were stored in the synagogue, e.g. the furniture from other synagogues. Ten years after the war, the synagogue was handed over to the Jewish Museum and in 1958–1959 it was completely restored inside. In the following year an exposition of synagogue textiles was opened there. In the 1970s the building became neglected and it was closed after 1982. The restoration started only after the Velvet revolution. Completely restored to its former beauty, the synagogue was re-opened with a ceremony in 1998.

Appearance 

The synagogue itself is two storeys high. Its ground plan is square. The main hall with a dome is surrounded by three built-in balconies. At the south balcony, there is an organ. In the eastern wall there is a great round stained glass window with a central ornament of Magen David (hexagram), installed in 1882–1883. Underneath it there is a monumental aron ha-kodesh. The most impressive decorative element in the synagogue is a gilded and multi-colored parquet arabesque. Its designers, Antonín Baum and Bedřich Münzberger, were inspired by Arabic architecture and art. The synagogue was decorated according to their design in 1882–1893.
The disposition of the synagogue is reform – the reading platform, bimah, is situated at the eastern wall, not in the central space as in older synagogues. Benches (not original, but from synagogue in Zruč nad Sázavou) stand in rows (as in a church), not around the walls. The aron ha-kodesh is designed in the style of mihrab, and has no curtain (parochet) today.

Today 

Since the last restoration in 1998, an exhibition about the modern history of Jews in the Czech Republic can be seen there. It begins with reforms initiated by enlightened Hapsburg Emperor Joseph II [Holy Roman Emperor], which started the 'Jewish emancipation'  and the social inclusion of Jews into the larger society. Many personalities, who have contributed to its economy, science and culture, are mentioned here. Traumatic events of the 20th century are also commemorated. The themes of modern times accords well with the relationship between the synagogue and the Reform Jewish Community. The European Cantors Association [WWW.cantors.eu]  held the concert for their 11th Annual Convention in the Spanish Synagogue in front of a packed crowd on 19 November 2016. Arranged as a tribute to ECA Convenor, Alex Klein, the concert was led by the Tel Aviv Cantorial Institute Choir conducted by [Orthodox Jewish] Cantor Naftali Herstik.

See also
Spanish Synagogue, Venice

References

Literature 
 Pařík, Arno, Dana Cabanová a Petr Kliment, Pražské synagogy = Prague Synagogues = Prager Synagogen, 2. vydání, Praha: Židovské muzeum v Praze, 2011, s. 87–97.
 Alina Heitlinger In the Shadows of the Holocaust and Communism:Czech and Slovak Jews Since 1945, Transaction Publishers, New Brunswick, New Jersey, 2006 s.181

External links

 "Spanish Synagogue", Jewish Museum, Prague
 "Spanish Synagogue", Prague tourist guide
 Ivan Kalmar. U. of Toronto. The Origin of the "Spanish Synagogue" of Prague, 1999, updated June 2006

Ashkenazi Jewish culture in the Czech Republic
Ashkenazi synagogues
Conservative Judaism in Europe
Conservative synagogues
Moorish Revival architecture in the Czech Republic
Moorish Revival synagogues
Synagogues completed in 1868
Synagogues in Prague
Museums in Prague
Synagogues preserved as museums
Synagogue buildings with domes
1868 establishments in Austria-Hungary
Josefov (Prague)
Former synagogues in the Czech Republic
19th-century religious buildings and structures in the Czech Republic